The 1995 Connecticut Huskies football team represented the University of Connecticut in the 1995 NCAA Division I-AA football season.  The Huskies were led by second year head coach Skip Holtz, and completed the season with a record of 8–3.

Schedule

References

Connecticut
UConn Huskies football seasons
Connecticut Huskies football